Sebastian Griesbeck (born 3 October 1990) is a German professional footballer who plays as a defensive midfielder for 2. Bundesliga club Greuther Fürth.

Career
Griesbeck played for 1. FC Heidenheim in the 2. Bundesliga before moving to Bundesliga club Union Berlin on a free transfer in July 2020.

References

External links
 
 

1990 births
Living people
Association football midfielders
German footballers
SSV Ulm 1846 players
1. FC Heidenheim players
1. FC Union Berlin players
SpVgg Greuther Fürth players
Bundesliga players
2. Bundesliga players
3. Liga players
Sportspeople from Ulm
Footballers from Baden-Württemberg